Jean-François Bach (born 8 June 1940 in Yvré-l'Évêque, Sarthe) is a French medical professor, biologist and immunologist. He is Secrétaire perpétuel honoraire of the Académie des sciences.

Biography 
He is the grandson of a professor of pharmacy and a former director of the ENS de Saint-Cloud and son of a professor of medicine in paediatrics. He is preparing for the Polytechnique exam in the preparatory class of the Louis-le-Grand high school. After a few months of special mathematics class he decided to change his orientation by choosing medicine.

He is Jean Hamburger's student at Necker Hospital. He received his doctorate in medicine in 1969 and in science in 1970. His science thesis gives rise to three articles in Nature.

Correspondant in 1977, he was elected in 1985 as a member of the Académie des sciences, where he was one of the two Secrétaires perpétuels from 2006 to 2015. He is also Professor Emeritus at the University of Paris-Descartes.

He was Director of Inserm Unit 25 (Renal Immunopathology) and CNRS Laboratory 122 (Allograft Immunology), while also directing the Claude Bernard Association's centre on autoimmune diseases.

Among its other activities and functions:

Present

 Member of the Board of Directors of the Fondation de la Maison de la Chimie
 Secretary General of the Day Solvay Foundation
 Member of the National Consultative Ethics Committee

Past events

 Member of the Board of Directors of the Hubert Beuve Méry Association
 Vice-President of the Foundation for Medical Research for more than 20 years
 Chairman of the Scientific Council of the Gustave-Roussy Institute (1981-1987)
 Vice-Chairman of the Scientific Council of the Institut Pasteur (1982-1984)
 President of the Scientific Council of the League against Cancer (1987-1997)
 Vice-President of the University of Paris V (1992-1995)
 Vice-President of the International Society of Transplantation (1995-1996)
 Member of the Scientific Council of Assistance Publique (1995-2001)
 President of the Clinical Immunology Committee of the IUIS (International Union of Immunology Societies) (2000-2002)
 Member of the WHO Committee on Vaccine Safety
 Chairman of the Committee for the Review of the Science Programmes at the College and of the Scientific Commission of the Common Base
 President of the Jean Dausset Foundation Centre for the Study of Human Polymorphism

Works 
He publishes alone or in collaboration, nearly 700 articles as well as several scientific books, including his Traité d'immunologie (six French editions and translated into 3 languages).

His personal work concerns more particularly the study of subpopulations of T lymphocytes related to thymus activity; the characterization of thymic hormones and in particular thymulin, which he synthesizes; the action of immunosuppressants (cyclosporin, antilymphocyte sera, monoclonal antibodies against Tlymphocytes).

He has been interested in the mechanisms and treatments of autoimmune diseases and more specifically insulin-dependent diabetes. He played a decisive role in the implementation of treatments for this disease with ciclosporin and, more recently, with anti-CD3 monoclonal antibodies. Finally, he showed that the decrease in the frequency of infections in developed countries explained the increase in the incidence of autoimmune diseases (hygienist theory).

Awards and distinctions 
Among other awards and honours:

 Grand Prize of the Académie des sciences (Jaffé Prize) (1976)
 European Society of Clinical Investigation Award (1976)
 Gold medal of the European Society of Allergology and Clinical Immunology (1978)
 Prix du rayonnement français (1981)
 Member of the Académie nationale de Médecine (elected in 1990)
 Member of the Académie nationale de Pharmacie (elected in 1990)
 Antoine-Laurent Lavoisier Prize from the University of California (1993)
 Member of the Royal Belgian Academy of Medicine (elected in 1994)
 Prize of the Institute of Health Sciences (1998)
 Barbara Davis Prize from the University of Colorado (2000)
 Member of the British Academy of Medical Sciences (elected in 2006)

He is also:

   Commandeur of the Ordre of the Légion  d'Honneur
   Commandeur of the Ordre National du Mérite

Notes and references 

Members of the French Academy of Sciences
French immunologists
20th-century French physicians
Commanders of the Ordre national du Mérite
Commandeurs of the Légion d'honneur
1940 births
Living people